Colonization is the process of establishing a colony.

Colonization or colonisation may also refer to:
 In the United States, before the Civil War, the philosophy or policy of sending African Americans to Africa, supported by the American Colonization Society and origin of Liberia
 Colonisation (biology), the process in biology by which a species spreads to new areas
 Space colonization, the human migration to other bodies in the Solar System
 Colonization (series), a trilogy of books by Harry Turtledove
 Sid Meier's Colonization, a computer game released by Microprose in 1994
 Civilization IV: Colonization, a 2008 remake of the 1994 game